Oliver Booth Dickinson (September 25, 1857 – September 16, 1939) was a United States district judge of the United States District Court for the Eastern District of Pennsylvania.

Education and career

Born in Dayton, Ohio, Dickinson graduated from Bucknell University in 1877 and read law in 1878. He received an Artium Magister degree from Bucknell University in 1903. He was in private practice in Chester, Pennsylvania from 1878 to 1914.

Federal judicial service

On March 31, 1914, Dickinson was nominated by President Woodrow Wilson to a new seat on the United States District Court for the Eastern District of Pennsylvania created by 38 Stat. 283. He was confirmed by the United States Senate on April 28, 1914, and received his commission the same day, serving thereafter until his death on September 16, 1939.

References

Sources
 

1857 births
1939 deaths
Judges of the United States District Court for the Eastern District of Pennsylvania
United States district court judges appointed by Woodrow Wilson
20th-century American judges
United States federal judges admitted to the practice of law by reading law
People from Dayton, Ohio